WindForce PLC is  the largest renewable energy private sector company in Sri Lanka. The company was incorporated in 2010 and in 2021 was listed on the Colombo Stock Exchange. The company commission, construct and operate power plants and generate power through wind, solar and hydropower.

History
The company is incorporated in July 2010 and listed on the Colombo Stock Exchange in 2021.

IPO
In 2021, through an initial public offering (IPO), the company was planned to raise up to LKR3.2 billion by offering a stake of 15% in the company. With the capital raised through the IPO the company is planning to build a 15MW wind plant in Mannar, Sri Lanka and a 30MW solar plant with 7.5MW battery storage in Senegal. The company is expected to become the largest renewable energy company, exceeding the second-placed company by over five times. WindForce's IPO was the largest since in 2011 in the Colombo Stock Exchange. It attracted 1,654 applications amounting to LKR25.7 billion, oversubscribing by nearly eight times on the first day of the IPO.

Post-IPO trading
The company declared an interim dividend for the financial year 2021/22, which corresponds to a LKR0.75 dividend per share yielding a 4.75% return. WindForce acquired 33.3% of stake in Solar Universe (Pvt) Ltd, a solar power plant in Vavunathivu. Vidullanka PLC and HiEnergy Services (Pvt) Ltd are the other two stakeholders of the plant and will add 10MW to the National Grid annually. The company acquired a 500 tons per day waste to energy plant from Fairway Holdings, the company acquired 92.5 per cent of the stake. The plant is located in Karadiyana, 15km from Colombo. In June 2021, the company received the Cabinet approval to build the planned wind power plants in Mannar.

Operations
The company is an independent power producer with an installed capacity of 218 megawatts. 77% of the effective capacity is based in Sri Lanka and the rest is based in Pakistan, Ukraine and Uganda. The company operates 27 power plants. Seven of the plants are wind power plants while 10 is solar plants and the other 10 are mini-hydropower plants. The company is planned to develop a solar power plant in Cameroon and is looking for opportunities in Bangladesh and Africa.

Wind farms

Solar farms

Hydroelectric power stations

Source: Annual Report 2020/21

See also
 List of Sri Lankan public corporations by market capitalisation

References

External links
 Official website

2010 establishments in Sri Lanka
Energy companies established in 2010
Renewable energy companies of Asia
Companies listed on the Colombo Stock Exchange
Electric power companies of Sri Lanka